Gábor Bozsik (born October 26, 1981) is a Hungarian sprint canoer who has competed since the mid-2000s. He won two medals in the K-4 500 m at the ICF Canoe Sprint World Championships with a silver in 2006 and a bronze in 2007.

Bozsik also finished fifth in the K-4 1000 m event at the 2008 Summer Olympics in Beijing.

References

Sports-reference.com profile

1981 births
Canoeists at the 2008 Summer Olympics
Hungarian male canoeists
Living people
Olympic canoeists of Hungary
ICF Canoe Sprint World Championships medalists in kayak
Canoeists at the 2015 European Games
European Games competitors for Turkey
21st-century Hungarian people